York is the name of some places in the U.S. state of Wisconsin:
York, Clark County, Wisconsin, a town
York, Dane County, Wisconsin, a town
York, Green County, Wisconsin, a town
York, Jackson County, Wisconsin, an unincorporated community
York Center, Wisconsin, an unincorporated community

See also
 York (disambiguation)